The following lists events that happened during 2015 in the Republic of Haiti.

Incumbents
President: Michel Martelly
Prime Minister: Florence Duperval Guillaume (acting) (until 16 January), Evans Paul (starting 16 January)

Events

January
 January 14 - The Haitian Parliament dissolves, causing political uncertainty.

February 
 February 17 - Carnival festivities are cancelled after at least twenty people are killed in a float accident in Port-au-Prince.

References

 
Years of the 21st century in Haiti
2010s in Haiti
Haiti
Haiti